An arrowhead is the point of an arrow.

Arrowhead or Arrow Head may also refer to:

Geography

Antarctica 
 Arrowhead Range, Victoria Land
 Arrowhead Nunatak, Oates Land

Canada 
 Arrowhead, British Columbia, a former steamboat port and town, now submerged
 Arrowhead Mountain, Ellesmere Island, Nunavut
 Arrowhead Provincial Park, located in Huntsville, Ontario
 Arrowhead Lake (Ontario), four lakes in the province of Ontario

United States 
 Arrowhead, one of three villages comprising Beaver Creek Resort, Colorado
 Arrowhead Township, St. Louis County, Minnesota
 Arrowhead, Virginia, an unincorporated community
 Arrowhead Region, a region of northeastern Minnesota
 Arrowhead State Trail
 Mount Arrowhead, Baranof Island, Alaska
 Arrowhead Mountain (Washington), in the Cascade Range
 Arrowhead Lake (Idaho)
 Lake Arrowhead, Georgia
 Lake Arrowhead (Maine), an artificial lake
 Arrowhead Marsh, Oakland, California
 Arrowhead Pool, Grand Teton National Park, Wyoming
 Camp Arrowhead (disambiguation), various campgrounds, a summer camp and a day camp
 Arrowhead Recreation Area, Claremont, New Hampshire
 Arrowhead State Park, now Arrowhead Area, Pittsburg County, Oklahoma

Homes 
 Arrowhead (science fiction venue), the home of science fiction writer James Blish and his wife, literary agent and science fiction writer Virginia Kidd, frequented by many notable science fiction writers
 Arrowhead (Charlottesville, Virginia), United States, a historic home and farm complex
 Arrowhead (Herman Melville House), home of author Herman Melville in Pittsfield, Massachusetts

Military
 Arrowhead 140, the export version of the Royal Navy Type 31 frigate designed by Babcock International
 Arrowhead device, a US military decoration
 Apache Arrowhead, a helicopter vision system
 , a World War II Royal Navy/Royal Canadian Navy corvette
 , a planned destroyer tender that was cancelled due to the end of World War II
 , a US Navy submarine support vessel launched in 2009

Animals 
 Arrowhead dogfish, a fish species
 Arrowhead piculet, a bird species
 Arrowhead warbler, a bird species
 Verrucosa arenata, a spider species, also known as the arrowhead spider
 The AR strain of Drosophila pseudoobscura  see Drosophila pseudoobscura § Arrowhead

Plants 
 Sagittaria, a genus of aquatic plants mostly native to the Americas
 Nephthytis, a genus of herbaceous plants native to western Africa
 Syngonium, a genus woody vines native to Africa, Mexico, and the West Indies

Business 
 Arrowhead Game Studios, a video game development company in Stockholm, Sweden
 Arrowhead Inn, a gambling and entertainment venue on Saratoga Lake, New York in the 1930s
 Arrowhead Mall, Muskogee, Oklahoma
 Arrowhead Pawn Shop, Jonesboro, Georgia, noted for the number of guns sold there that were later used in crimes
 Arrowhead Pharmaceuticals, a biopharmaceutical company based in Pasadena, California
 Arrowhead Towne Center, Glendale, Arizona
 Arrowhead Water, a brand of bottled water owned by Nestlé

Film and television 
 Arrowhead (1953 film), an American western film starring Charlton Heston and Jack Palance
 Arrowhead (1994 film), a Canadian short mockumentary
 Arrowhead (2015 film), an Australian science fiction film
 ""Arrow Head", an episode of the television series King of the Hill (season 2)

Sports 
 Arrowhead Stadium, Kansas City, Missouri
 Arrowhead 135, an annual ultramarathon event staged in International Falls, Minnesota
 Arrowhead (American football), a Native American National Football League player in the 1923 season
 Arrowhead Conference, consisting of six junior colleges in northern Illinois
 Arrowhead League, a California high school athletic league

Other uses 
 Arrowhead Regional Medical Center, Colton, California, a teaching hospital
 Arrowhead High School, Hartland, Wisconsin
 Arrowhead Christian Academy, a private Christian high school in Redlands, California
 Arrowhead (train), a train operated by Amtrak in the 1970s
 Arrowhead Line, a streetcar line operated by Pacific Electric in the early 1900s
 Arrow Head, a Rock Island Rockets, a baggage-dinette-coach railroad car
 Arrowhead Library System (Minnesota), a public library system
 Arrowhead Library System (Wisconsin), a public library system

See also 
 Arrowhead matrix, used in linear algebra
 Arrowhead Pond, former name of an indoor arena in Anaheim, California
 ARMA 2: Operation Arrowhead, an expansion pack for the military simulation video game ArmA II
 Arrow (disambiguation)